52nd Street is a closed train station that was located at the intersection of North 52nd Street & Merion Avenue (just north of Lancaster Avenue (US-30)) in the West Philadelphia section of Philadelphia, Pennsylvania, United States. It was built by the Pennsylvania Railroad (PRR) at the junction of its Main Line and its Schuylkill Branch. Today, these lines are the SEPTA Regional Rail Paoli/Thorndale Line and Cynwyd Line, respectively.

History

At 52nd Street, the Main Line is on an embankment at-grade, while the Schuylkill Branch is on an elevated structure including a Parker through truss spanning  over the Main Line on an extreme skew. A lit sign informed inbound passengers which platform the next train to Center City, Philadelphia would depart from.  Only a few trains in each direction stopped at this station, mostly serving reverse commuters heading out to jobs in the Main Line suburbs in the morning and returning home to the city in the evening.

Through merger and bankruptcy, the station and the trains serving it passed from the PRR to the Penn Central to Conrail (the later under contract to SEPTA). The first westbound morning trip of Amtrak's Silverliner Service also stopped at the station.

The station was burned by vandals on August 16, 1980. Conrail bused passengers until the 23rd, when SEPTA chose to outright close the station. The station came down in 1995 as part of revitalization efforts.

Proposals have been made to reopen the station, either in conjunction with projects such as the Schuylkill Valley Metro, or as part of community revitalization efforts.

References

External links
Abandoned 52nd Street PRR Station (WorldNYCSubway.org)

Former Pennsylvania Railroad stations
Railway stations closed in 1980
Philadelphia to Harrisburg Main Line
Railway stations in the United States opened in 1902
Former Amtrak stations in Pennsylvania
1902 establishments in Pennsylvania
1980 disestablishments in Pennsylvania
Former SEPTA Regional Rail stations
Former railway stations in Philadelphia